The 2013 Players' Championship was a curling tournament held from April 16 to 21 at the Mattamy Athletic Centre (Maple Leaf Gardens) in Toronto, Ontario as part of the 2012–13 World Curling Tour. It was the fourth men's and fifth women's Grand Slam event of the 2012–13 curling season. The event was held in a round robin format.

Men

Teams
The teams are listed as follows:

Round-robin standings
Final round-robin standings

Round-robin results
All draw times are listed in Eastern Daylight Time (UTC−4).

Draw 1
Tuesday, April 16, 7:00 pm

Draw 3
Wednesday, April 17, 12:00 pm

Draw 4
Wednesday, April 17, 3:30 pm

Draw 5
Wednesday, April 17, 7:30 pm

Draw 7
Thursday, April 18, 12:00 pm

Draw 9
Thursday, April 18, 7:30 pm

Draw 11
Friday, April 19, 12:00 pm

Draw 12
Friday, April 19, 3:30 pm

Draw 13
Friday, April 19, 7:30 pm

Tiebreakers
Saturday, April 20, 8:30 am

Playoffs

Quarterfinals
Saturday, April 20, 3:00 pm

Semifinals
Saturday, April 20, 7:30 pm

Final
Sunday, April 21, 1:00 pm

Women

Teams
The teams are listed as follows:

Round-robin standings
Final round-robin standings

Round-robin results
All draw times are listed in Eastern Daylight Time (UTC−4).

Draw 1
Tuesday, April 16, 7:00 pm

Draw 2
Wednesday, April 17, 8:30 am

Draw 3
Wednesday, April 17, 12:00 pm

Draw 4
Wednesday, April 17, 3:30 pm

Draw 5
Wednesday, April 17, 7:30 pm

Draw 6
Thursday, April 18, 8:30 am

Draw 7
Thursday, April 18, 12:00 pm

Draw 8
Thursday, April 18, 3:30 pm

Draw 10
Friday, April 19, 8:30 am

Draw 11
Friday, April 19, 12:00 pm

Draw 12
Friday, April 19, 3:30 pm

Tiebreakers
Friday, April 19, 7:30 pm

Saturday, April 19, 8:30 am

Playoffs

Quarterfinals
Saturday, April 20, 11:30 am

Semifinals
Saturday, April 20, 7:30 pm

Final
Sunday, April 21, 9:00 am

Notes

References

External links

2013 in Canadian curling
Curling in Toronto
Players' Championship
2013 in Toronto